Montes de Toledo may refer to:
Montes de Toledo, a mountain system running across central Spain reaching into Portugal
Montes de Toledo (DO) (Aceite Montes de Toledo), a Spanish geographical indication for olive oil production
Montes de Toledo Comarca, a comarca in Toledo Province